The 2016 Women's International Match Racing Series was a series of match racing sailing regattas staged during 2016 season.

Regattas

Standings

References

External links
 Official website

2016
2016 in sailing